Henry Hollingsworth (1808-1855) was a Democratic politician. He served as the Mayor of Nashville, Tennessee, from 1837 to 1839.

Early life
Hollingsworth was born in Nelson County, Virginia, on August 8, 1808. He and a twin sister, Mary Ann, they were probably the only children born to William Hollingsworth and his 3rd wife Frances "Fanny" Wright-Hollingsworth. He was born in the humble walks of life, and up to manhood he earned his support by the labour of his hands. He moved to Nashville in 1933.

Career
In the year 1833 he came to Nashville and became a candidate for night watch; but he was unsuccessful, not receiving a single vote. Defeat, however, had not its usual effect upon him. Instead of dampening his aspirations, it caused him to elevate his aims higher. He thereupon commenced the study of law in the office of William L. Brown, Esq. And was shortly after admitted to the bar.

In 1836 he served with honour in the  Seminole Wars. as First Lieutenant in Capt. Battle's company of mounted men.

From 1837 and 1839, he served as Mayor of Nashville. He presented over the Mayor's Court with dignity and ability, and gave general satisfaction in his administration of the city affairs.

In 1841 he was nominated by the Democratic party as a candidate for the State Senate, and received a vote beyond his party strength.

Personal life and death
On April 29, 1837, in District of Columbia, Hollingsworth married Eliza O’Brien. They had one son, Lucian B Hollingsworth, born in May 1838 in Nashville, Tennessee

His wife Eliza died in May 1839 at the age of 21. They had been married 2 years.

On July 25, 1843, in Davidson County, Tennessee he remarried to a widow, Mrs. Anna Bell Dozier Stump. 
They had the following children during their marriage:

Edna Hollingsworth born June 24, 1844, in Davidson, Tennessee.
Nancy "Nannie" Hollingsworth born October 23, 1845, in Nashville, Tennessee.
Mary Hollingsworth born 1847 in Davidson, Tennessee.
Henrietta Hollingsworth born in 1854 in Davidson, Tennessee.

Hollingsworth died on January 24, 1855, at his residence in Davidson County, Tennessee, after a lingering illness of several months.

References

1808 births
1855 deaths
People from Nelson County, Virginia
American people of the Seminole Wars
Tennessee Democrats
Mayors of Nashville, Tennessee
19th-century American politicians